The South Island stout-legged wren or Yaldwyn's wren (Pachyplichas yaldwyni) is an extinct species of New Zealand wren, a family of small birds endemic to New Zealand.

History and etymology
The holotype is a right tarsometatarsus (NMNZS 22683 in the collections of the National Museum) collected on 29 September 1983 from the Honeycomb Hill Cave.  The specific epithet honours Dr John Yaldwyn, Director of the National Museum of New Zealand in Wellington, in recognition of his contributions to avian palaeontology.

Description
It was the largest (by weight) of the New Zealand wrens.  The morphology of the wren indicates that it was strongly adapted to a terrestrial existence. Radiocarbon dates for the assemblages with which it is associated range from 25,000 BP to 1,000 BP.  Either flightless or nearly so, it became extinct following the occupation of New Zealand by the Polynesian ancestors of the Māori, and the associated introduction of the kiore (Pacific rat).

Distribution and habitat
The subfossil remains of the wren have only been found in the South Island of New Zealand, and it seems to have formed a species pair with the closely related P. jagmi, which was only found in the North Island.  Since it has been found in association with four other species of acanthisittids in four genera (at the Honeycomb Hill Cave site) it is likely that its ecological niche was different enough for it to have coexisted with them.  Sites where it was found indicate that it inhabited lowland mixed podocarp broadleaf forest, ranging upwards into alpine tundra scrubland.

References

Notes

Sources

External links
 Holotype of Pachyplichas yaldwyni from the collection of the Museum of New Zealand Te Papa Tongarewa
 [http://collections.tepapa.govt.nz/objectdetails.aspx?oid=710964 Stout-legged Wren, Pachyplichas yaldwyni, by Paul Martinson]. Artwork produced for the book Extinct Birds of New Zealand'', by Alan Tennyson, Te Papa Press, Wellington, 2006

Extinct birds of New Zealand
Pachyplichas
Holocene extinctions
Fossil taxa described in 1988
Species made extinct by human activities
Late Quaternary prehistoric birds
Species endangered by invasive species
Birds described in 1988